The Central Committee of the Communist Party of Cuba (PCC) is the highest decision-making body of the party between convocations of the PCC Congress.

History
The Central Committee was established on 3 October 1965 when the United Party of the Cuban Socialist Revolution was transformed into the present-day Communist Party of Cuba. Between Central Committee plenary sessions the Politburo and the Secretariat meet in its place.  It has been led since its establishment in 1965 by the First and Second Secretary of the Central Committee. 

Alternate membership of the Central Committee was abolished at the 4th Party Congress, held on 10–14 October 1991, with the intention of streamlining the party's decision-making process.

Terms

See also
 Politburo of the Communist Party of Cuba
 Secretariat of the Communist Party of Cuba

References

Specific

Bibliography
Articles and journals:
 

Books:
 

Central Committee of the Communist Party of Cuba
1965 establishments in Cuba